Ergavia subrufa is a moth of the  family Geometridae. It is found on Jamaica.

References

Moths described in 1897
Oenochrominae